The 2008 congressional elections in Maine were held on November 4, 2008 to determine representation for the state of Maine in the United States House of Representatives, coinciding with the presidential and senatorial elections. Representatives are elected for two-year terms; those elected will serve in the 111th Congress from January 3, 2009 until January 3, 2011.

Maine has two seats in the House, apportioned according to the 2000 United States Census. Its 2007-2008 congressional delegation consisted of two Democrats. No districts changed party, although CQ Politics forecasted district 1 to be at some risk for the incumbent party.

The primary election for Republican Party and Democratic Party candidates was held on June 10.<ref>Tabulations for Elections held in 2008  Maine Secretary of State'''</ref>

Overview

District 1

This was an open seat in 2008 because incumbent Democrat Tom Allen ran for the U.S. Senate seat held by Republican Susan Collins. Democrats were favored to hold this seat but were not assured of victory; John Kerry won 55% here in 2004 (CPVI=D+6). The Democratic nominee was Chellie Pingree, former Common Cause President and former Maine Senate Majority Leader who ran against Collins in 2002. The Republican nominee was Charlie Summers, former Maine State Senator, Northeast Small Business Administration Director and Iraq War veteran who ran against Allen in 2004. CQ Politics forecasted the race as 'Democrat Favored'.

Democratic primary

Republican primary

General election

District 2

Incumbent Democrat Mike Michaud (campaign website) was challenged by Republican John N. Frary. CQ Politics forecasted the race as 'Safe Democrat'.

References

External links
Elections Division from the Maine Secretary of StateU.S. Congress candidates for Maine at Project Vote Smart
Campaign contributions for Maine congressional races from OpenSecrets
Maine U.S. House of Representatives race from 2008 Race Tracker''

2008
Maine
United States House of Representatives